Juan José Albornoz Figueroa (born 12 February 1982) is a Chilean retired footballer who played as a midfielder.

Honours

Club
Rangers
 Primera B (1): 1997 Apertura

Provincial Osorno
 Primera B (1): 2007

Curicó Unido
 Primera B (1): 2008

References
 
 

1982 births
Living people
Chilean footballers
People from Talca
Association football midfielders
Rangers de Talca footballers
Lota Schwager footballers
Universidad de Concepción footballers
Unión San Felipe footballers
Provincial Osorno footballers
Curicó Unido footballers
Club Deportivo Palestino footballers
Deportes Copiapó footballers
Chilean Primera División players
Primera B de Chile players
Chile under-20 international footballers
Olympic footballers of Chile